Baru (also Romanized as Bārū; also known as Bārū'ī) is a village in Radkan Rural District, in the Central District of Chenaran County, Razavi Khorasan Province, Iran. At the 2006 census, its population was 50, in 13 families.

References 

Populated places in Chenaran County